The Battle of Rajgród was a battle fought on 29 May 1831 between Poland and Imperial Russia, during the November Uprising. The Poles, according to some accounts, were victorious.

Background
Due to the Polish expedition against the Russian guards in the area led by Antanas Gelgaudas failing near Łomża, a retreat was ordered to Rajgród, where they would encounter the Russians, which had a force of 5,800 men.

After the Battle of Ostrołęka Gelgaudas' force planned a march on Lithuania, which also included the city as part of the route.

Battle
Both forces met, and as the guards started a fight Atantanas' vanguard near the village of Miecze, they were attacked during a march and forced to retreat to Rajgród, which they were pushed out of and lost the battle, which resulted in 800 casualties and 1,200 prisoners of war.  

This victory was an important strategic move for the Poles, as the Russians gave them an open way to Lithuania, where there was an active partisan movement since February.

References

Conflicts in 1831
Rajgrod
May 1831 events
1831 in Poland